James Reid (1839–1908) was Unionist MP for Greenock from 1900 to 1906.

References

External links 
 

1839 births
1908 deaths
Members of the Parliament of the United Kingdom for Scottish constituencies
Scottish Tory MPs (pre-1912)
UK MPs 1900–1906